Kato E. Serwanga (born July 23, 1976) is a former American football cornerback in the National Football League.  He attended the University of California at Berkeley, California State University, Sacramento and the University of the Pacific.  His hometown is Sacramento, California, where he and his brother were standout defensive backs for the Sacramento High School Dragons.  He is the identical twin brother of former NFL player Wasswa Serwanga.

1976 births
Living people
Ugandan players of American football
Identical twins
American football cornerbacks
California Golden Bears football players
New England Patriots players
Washington Redskins players
New York Giants players
Sacramento State Hornets football players
Pacific Tigers football players
Sportspeople from Kampala
American twins
Twin sportspeople
Ugandan emigrants to the United States
Ugandan twins